Fairfax University of America (FXUA, formerly Virginia International University) is a private university in Fairfax, Virginia. It was established in 1998, and then as a non-profit 501(c)(3) university in 1999. The university is certified to operate in Virginia by the State Council of Higher Education for Virginia (SCHEV) and is accredited by the Accrediting Council for Independent Colleges and Schools  to award certificates, bachelor's degrees, and master's degrees.

Accreditation and certification 
The university is certified to operate in Virginia by the State Council of Higher Education for Virginia (SCHEV) and is accredited by the Accrediting Council for Independent Colleges and Schools  to award certificates, bachelor's degrees, and master's degrees. ACICS came under heavy scrutiny by regulators for its lax accreditation standards and failure to flag deficient programs at several institutions, including Fairfax University, which was "blasted [for] the quality and rigor of its online education program" by state regulators in 2019 and nearly closed down.

History 
The University states it was founded in 1998 as Virginia International University. In 1999, the university was incorporated as a non-profit corporation and obtained 501(c)3 non-profit status. 

The university held its first commencement on May 4, 2006, with 20 graduates in attendance.

In March 2019, the State Council of Higher Education for Virginia threatened to revoke VIU's license to operate in the Commonwealth of Virginia after a 2018 audit found defects in the academic rigor and quality of VIU's online courses, publishing a report that Inside Higher Ed called "scathing". The audit cited several concerns including widespread instances of plagiarism and its admissions policy that allowed international students who demonstrated "abysmally poor" English language skills to attend the university. Although the audit was focused on the schools online courses, auditors suggested that the issues likely impacted face-to-face classes as well, noting that online courses and in-person courses shared common teaching faculty, while the English proficiency issues were common among students attending in-person classes.

In June 2019, the State Council reached an agreement with VIU to allow the college to continue operating on the condition that they pause its distance education for at least three years.

The University changed its name to Fairfax University of America (FXUA) on January 1, 2020.

On December 13, 2021, the State Council completed their audit, finding FXUA to be in full compliance of SCHEV regulations, permitting FXUA to immediately begin offering distance education again.

Academics  
The university's academic units are organized into two schools: the School of Business and the School of Computer Information Systems. In Fall 2021 there were 5 full-time instructional faculty and 13 part-time instructional faculty.

New Lines Institute for Strategy and Policy 
Fairfax University of America operates a research institute, founded in 2019, the New Lines Institute for Strategy and Policy (formerly the Center for Global Policy) is a foreign policy think tank operating out of Washington, D.C. It hosts New Lines magazine, edited by Hassan Hassan and focusing on the Middle East.

Student life
17 (8 undergraduate) students were enrolled at the university as of 2022.

References

Private universities and colleges in Virginia
Education in Fairfax County, Virginia
Colleges accredited by the Accrediting Council for Independent Colleges and Schools
Educational institutions established in 1998
1998 establishments in Virginia